USS Josephus Daniels (DLG/CG-27) was a Belknap-class destroyer leader / cruiser. She was named for Josephus Daniels, Secretary of the Navy during World War I. She was launched as DLG-27, a frigate, and reclassified as a cruiser on 30 June 1975.

The contract to construct Josephus Daniels was awarded on 18 May 1961. Her keel was laid down at Bath Iron Works on 23 April 1962. She was launched on 2 December 1963, sponsored by Mrs. Robert M. Woronoff and Mrs. Clyde R. Rich Jr., granddaughters of Josephus Daniels; delivered to the navy on 4 May 1965 and commissioned on 8 May 1965.

After more than 28 years of service, Josephus Daniels was decommissioned on 21 January 1994. She was struck from the register on 21 January 1994 and laid up at James River Reserve Fleet, Fort Eustis, Virginia to be scrapped. The 'Joey D' was later dismantled by International Shipbreaking Ltd. of Brownsville, TX, with scrapping completed on 8 November 1999.

External links

USS Josephus Daniels unofficial website
GlobalSecurity.org
NavSource
DANFS

 

Belknap-class cruisers
Ships built in Bath, Maine
1963 ships
Cold War cruisers of the United States